A preureteric vena cava, also known as a retrocaval ureter, is a rare congenital malformation of the right human ureter, in which the ureter passes behind the inferior vena cava, causing compression possibly leading to hydronephrosis. The prevalence of this condition is approximately 1 per 1,000 persons, with males 2-3 times more likely than females to develop the condition. Symptoms often do not manifest until those with the condition are aged in their 20s or 30s.

References 
 
 
Congenital disorders of urinary system